Castellanos may refer to:

People
 Castellanos (surname)

Places

Argentina
 Castellanos Department, department of Santa Fe Province
 Aarón Castellanos, locality in the Santa Fe Province
 Castellanos, Santa Fe, locality in the Santa Fe Province

Spain 
 Castellanos de Castro, municipality in the province of Burgos
 Castellanos de Moriscos, municipality in the province of Salamanca
 Castellanos de Villiquera, municipality in the province of Salamanca
 Castellanos de Zapardiel, municipality in the province of Ávila

Uruguay 
 Castellanos, Uruguay, locality in the Canelones Department

See also
 Castellano (disambiguation)
 Pérez Castellanos, neighbourhood of Montevideo, Uruguay